Jin Dong (born 22 December 1976) is a Chinese actor. He is known for his television roles in Legend of Entrepreneurship (2012), The Disguiser (2015), Candle in the Tomb (2016), Surgeons (2017) and The First Half of My Life (2017).

Career
When he was a teenager, Jin Dong played a supporting role in television series Oriental Businessmen (1995). In 2003, he graduated from Central Drama Academy with a degree in performance.

Jin first gained critics' attention for his performance in the film Autumn Rain (2005), and was nominated for the Best Newcomer award at the Huabiao Awards. The film also won the Gold Award at the Yalta International Film Festival. He has also starred in numerous theater plays such as Sunrise (2008) and Jing Tian Lei (2010) where he played Mao Zedong. In 2012, Jin won the China Golden Lion Award for Drama, the highest honor awarded for theater play. Also in 2012, Jin won the Best Supporting Actor award at the Asia Rainbow TV Awards for his performance in Legend of Entrepreneurship.

Jin successfully broke into the mainstream with spy drama The Disguiser, which was a critical and commercial success. Jin reportedly gained 10 kg for his role as Ming Lou. He also made notable guest appearances in the highly popular historical drama Nirvana in Fire (2015) and the metropolitan romance series Ode to Joy (2016).

In 2016, Jin played Hu Bayi in web adaptation of popular tomb-raiding novel series Candle in the Tomb, produced by the same team behind Nirvana in Fire and The Disguiser. The series received positive acclaim for its performance.

In 2017, Jin starred alongside Bai Baihe in the medical drama Surgeons. He then starred in the romance drama The First Half of My Life, based on the novel of the same name by Yi Shu. The series was a ratings hit and became one of the most talked about dramas online. The same year, Jin became the vice president of China Television Artists Association. Jin ranked 50th on Forbes China Celebrity 100 list in 2017.

In 2018, Jin starred alongside Jiang Shuying in the romantic comedy series Mr. Right. The drama gained one of the highest viewership ratings of the year. The same year, he was cast in The People's Property, a political drama that is the sequel to the 2017 hit drama In the Name of People.

In 2019, Jin starred in the legal drama The Best Partner.

In 2020, Jiang starred in the healing romance drama If Time Flows Back. He ranked 63rd on Forbes China Celebrity 100 list.

Filmography

Film

Television series

Awards and nominations

References 

1976 births
Male actors from Shandong
Living people
Chinese male film actors
Chinese male television actors
Central Academy of Drama alumni
21st-century Chinese male actors
Members of the 14th Chinese People's Political Consultative Conference